The Pittsburgh Penguins are a franchise in the Eastern Conference of the National Hockey League (NHL). The team was founded as part of the league's expansion prior to the 1967–68 season. The franchise has had ten general managers in its history, with Jack Riley serving two terms. Eight games in March and April 1983 went without a general manager due to Aldege "Baz" Bastien's death in a car crash.

Key

General Managers

References

Notes 

Pittsburgh Penguins
  
Pittsburgh Penguins
gen